Ajudanieh is a neighbourhood in the north of Tehran, Iran. Ajudanieh is located in Niavaran district. The south end of the street leads to the Aghdasieh area, while the north end leads to Darabad.

History

Ajodanieh used to belong to the house of Qajar dynasty nobleman (Agha Reza Khan Eghbal Saltane ), That he was the special King's   (Naseredin Shah ) Ajodan (after whom Ajodanieh is named). Over years, the original estate was divided between family members and parts of it were sold off to the larger public.

Neighbourhoods in Tehran